Bajram Fevziu (1884–1928) was an Albanian army officer and politician who served as the 4th Chief of the General Staff of the Albanian Armed Forces and as Minister of Internal Affairs in the Sacred Union Government of Pandeli Evangjeli.

Biography
Bajram Fevziu was born in March 1884 in Vodenë, present day Kolonjë, then part of the Ottoman Empire. He finished his high school education in Thessaloniki (also at the time in the Ottoman Empire) and in 1906, graduated from the Higher Military Academy in Istanbul. In 1908, he completed his two-year studies in Vienna and was sent to the military Staff College in Paris where he remained for another two years. He returned to Albania in 1914 and joined the "National Wing" organization. In 1919 he served as deputy prefect of Peqin. On March 18, 1920, Fevziu became an advisor to then mayor of Shkodër, Musa Juka. On November 14, 1920, he was named deputy prefect in Korçë. In 1921 he was appointed Minister of Internal Affairs in the Sacred Union Government of Pandeli Evangjeli. During the period from 1921 until 1923 he served as deputy representing the Popular Party in the National Council. In 1922 he was named prefect of Vlorë. From 1922 to 1923, he served as chairman of the Albanian military commission at the International Borders Commission for the delimitation of Albania's borders. From August 1923 to December 1924, Fevziu served as Chief of the General Staff of the Army. In 1928 he became severely ill and was sent to a hospital in Vienna for treatment, where he eventually passed away.

References

Government ministers of Albania
Interior ministers of Albania
People from Kolonjë
Albanian generals
Albanian politicians
1884 births
1928 deaths
Albanians in the Ottoman Empire
Expatriates from the Ottoman Empire in the Austro-Hungarian Empire